Bùi Đắc Tuyên (died 1795) was a mandarin of the Tây Sơn dynasty. 

Born in Tuy Viễn District (mordern Tây Sơn District), Bình Định Province, he was a son of Bùi Đức Lương, an elder brother of Bùi Thị Nhạn, and an uncle of Bùi Thị Xuân.

In 1792, 9-year-old Nguyễn Quang Toản became emperor. He appointed Tuyên, a favourite of his, to the position thái sư ( "Grand Preceptor"). Tuyên, now regent of the country, subsequently banished one of the ministers, Trần Văn Kỷ, from Phú Xuân. 

His behavior angered many ministers and generals, and in 1795, Kỷ persuaded Vũ Văn Dũng to stage a coup against Tuyên. Dũng, Phạm Công Hưng, and Nguyễn Văn Huấn besieged Tuyên's house and put him in prison. 

Dũng ordered Nguyễn Quang Thùy to arrest Ngô Văn Sở, who was a political ally of Tuyên, in Tonkin. At the same time, Huấn was sent to Quy Nhơn to arrest Tuyên's son Bùi Đắc Trụ in Quy Nhơn. Sở and Trụ were taken to Phú Xuân and thrown into the Perfume River together with Tuyên. The boy-emperor could do nothing but weep.

References

1795 deaths
People from Bình Định province
Tây Sơn dynasty officials
People executed by drowning